Micromyzon is a genus of tiny catfish in the family Aspredinidae native to relatively deep parts of the Amazon and Orinoco basins in South America.

Species
There are currently 2 recognized species in this genus:

 Micromyzon akamai Friel & Lundberg, 1996
 Micromyzon orinoco T. P Carvalho, Lundberg, Baskin, Friel & R. E. dos Reis, 2016

References

Aspredinidae
Freshwater fish genera